The commune of Butaganzwa is a commune of Kayanza Province in northern Burundi. The capital lies at Butaganzwa. In 2007, DGHER electrified two rural villages in the commune.

References

Communes of Burundi
Kayanza Province